Marcone is a family name of Italian origin. It may refer to:

People 
 Iván Marcone (born 1980), Argentine footballer
 Richard Gabriel Marcone (born 1993), Romania-born Italian footballer
 Vincent Marcone (born 1973), Canadian web designer, illustrator and musician
 Marcone Amaral Costa (born 1978), Brazil-born footballer naturalized Qatar

Fictional
 "Gentleman" Johnny Marcone, fictional character in the novel The Dresden Files
 Sheldon "Shelly" Marcone, fictional character in the film The Last Boy Scout

Geology 
 Selve Marcone, comune (municipality) in the Province of Biella in the Italian region Piedmont

Surnames of Italian origin